13th Rifle Division can refer to:

13th Guards Rifle Division
13th Motor Rifle Division NKVD
13th Rifle Division (Soviet Union)